The Vorskla (russian and Ukrainian - Ворскла) is a river that runs from Belgorod Oblast in Russia southwards into northeastern Ukraine, where it joins the Dnieper. Right tributaries of the river include the Vorsklytsia and Boromlia, and left tributaries  Merla, Kolomak and Tahamlyk.

Large cities on the river are Poltava (the capital of Poltava Oblast), Okhtyrka and Kobeliaky. The river is mostly navigable between its delta and Kobeliaky.

An ancient fort, thought to be Gelonos, is on the Vorskla south of Okhtyrka. In 1399, the Battle of the Vorskla River was fought in the area. In 1709, the city of Poltava was besieged by Charles XII.

Flora and fauna 
In the river there are more than 50 species of fish, most of which are carps and pikes, breams, rudds, roaches, minnows, catfish.

Fauna is represented by hares, foxes, in the woods you can meet roe deer and wild boar, a great variety of birds: wild duck, gray heron, partridge, pheasant.

Along the banks of the river there are large wooded areas, as coniferous (mostly on the left bank) and deciduous forests.

References

Rivers of Belgorod Oblast
Rivers of Poltava Oblast
Rivers of Sumy Oblast